This is a list of film sequels and their performance at the box office. All grosses are given in unadjusted US dollars.

For the tables presented below, determining what constitutes a film series and where a film fits in with the series is subjective. Box Office Mojo and The Numbers list 12 Star Wars films released, including anthology films such as Rogue One (2016) and Solo: A Star Wars Story (2018) (which Box Office Mojo also groups separately), and Star Wars: The Clone Wars, but excluding films such as Caravan of Courage: An Ewok Adventure (1984) and Ewoks: The Battle for Endor (1986). For the purpose of the tables presented here, the films of the "Skywalker saga" are considered as a separate series and are ordered based on the date of release rather than by their number (for example, Star Wars: Episode I – The Phantom Menace was the fourth film released). Similarly, the Marvel Cinematic Universe is listed on the above websites as consisting of 23 films released however, these are also listed separately as 4 Avengers films, 3 Iron Man films, 3 Captain America films, 3 Thor films and so on; for these tables, the films have similarly been treated as separate series. A similar approach has been taken to the Wizarding World series (where the films are split between the Harry Potter film series and the Fantastic Beasts film series); the X-Men film series (where there are separate film series for Wolverine and Deadpool); Star Trek (where there are separate film series for Star Trek: The Original Series, Star Trek: The Next Generation and a later reboot); and the multiple Spider-Man, Batman and Planet of the Apes film series.

Box-office improvement 
While sequels usually gross less than the original, some have significantly outperformed their predecessors at the box office.

Relative improvement 

These film sequels outgrossed their predecessors by at least a factor of three. The list is not adjusted for inflation.

Absolute improvement 
These film sequels outgrossed their predecessors by at least $500million. The list is not adjusted for inflation.

Highest-grossing sequels

See also 

 Highest grossing film franchises and film series

Notes 
Jumanji The Numbers includes Zathura: A Space Adventure in the Jumanji franchise, whereas Box Office Mojo does not.

References 

Sequels by box-office improvement
Sequels by box-office improvement